I Conquer the Sea! is a 1936 American drama film. Directed by Victor Halperin, the film stars Steffi Duna, Dennis Morgan, and Douglas Walton. It was released on January 24, 1936.

Cast list
 Steffi Duna as Rosita Gonzales
 Dennis Morgan as Tommy (credited as Stanly Morner)
 Douglas Walton as Leonard
 George Cleveland as Caleb
 Johnnie Pirrone Jr. as Pedro Gonzales
 Fred Warren as Sebastian
 Anna De Linsky as Mrs. Gonzales
 Charles McMurphy as Zack
 Frederick Peters as Stubby
 Tiny Skelton as Flukes
 Olin Francis as Gabe
 Albert Russell as Josh
 Dorothy Kildaire as Gabe's wife
 Renee Daniels as Stubby's wife
 James Hertz as Tiny
 Margaret Woodburn as Widow Penecoste

References

Films directed by Victor Halperin
American black-and-white films
American drama films
1936 drama films
1936 films
1930s American films